The 1980–81 Drexel Dragons men's basketball team represented Drexel University  during the 1980–81 NCAA Division I men's basketball season. The Dragons, led by 4th year head coach Eddie Burke, played their home games at the Daskalakis Athletic Center and were members of the East Coast Conference (ECC).

The team finished the season 14–13, and finished in 5th place in the ECC East in the regular season.

Roster

Schedule

|-
!colspan=9 style="background:#F8B800; color:#002663;"| Regular season
|-

|-
!colspan=12 style="background:#FFC600; color:#07294D;"| ECC Tournament
|-

Awards
Len Hatzenbeller
ECC Player of the Year
ECC All-Conference First Team

Mike Mitchell
ECC All-Rookie Team

References

Drexel Dragons men's basketball seasons
Drexel
Drexel
Drexel